Deudomperidone (developmental code name CIN-102; also known as deuterated domperidone) is a dopamine antagonist medication which is under development in the United States for the treatment of gastroparesis. It acts as a selective dopamine D2 and D3 receptor antagonist and has peripheral selectivity. Deudomperidone is a deuterated form of domperidone, and it is suggested that deudomperidone may have improved efficacy, tolerability, and pharmacokinetics compared to domperidone. As of January 2022, deudomperidone is in phase 2 clinical trials for the treatment of gastroparesis.

See also
 Metopimazine
 Trazpiroben

References

External links
 Deudomperidone - AdisInsight

Antiemetics
Antigonadotropins
Benzimidazoles
Chloroarenes
D2 antagonists
D3 antagonists
Deuterated compounds
Experimental drugs
Motility stimulants
Peripherally selective drugs
Piperidines
Prolactin releasers
Ureas